The Fatal Sign is a 1920 American crime film serial directed by Stuart Paton. It is considered to be a lost film.

Cast
 Claire Anderson as Genevieve
 Harry Carter as Indigo
 Leo D. Maloney as Jerry
 Boyd Irwin as Sydney
 Joseph W. Girard
 Frank Tokunaga
 Fontaine La Rue
 Jack Richardson

See also
 List of American films of 1920
 List of film serials
 List of film serials by studio
 List of lost films

References

External links

The Fatal Sign at silentera.com

Silent crime drama films
American crime drama films
1920 films
Silent American drama films
American silent serial films
American black-and-white films
Lost American films
Films directed by Stuart Paton
1920 lost films
Arrow Film Corporation films
1920s American films
1920 crime drama films
Lost crime drama films